Philiris hindenburgensis is a species of butterfly of the family Lycaenidae. It is found in Western Province of Papua New Guinea.

The length of the forewings is about 15.5 mm. The ground colour of the forewings is dull frosty purple blue, the termen broadly dark brown black. The hindwings are dull frosty purple blue, the costa and inner margin very broadly dark brown.

Etymology
The species name refers to the Hindenburg Wall, the type locality.

References

Butterflies described in 2014
Luciini